Alexander Alexandrovich Kopylov or Kopilov (Александр Александрович Копылов, 14 July 1854 – 20 February 1911) was an Imperial Russian composer and violinist.

Kopylov studied for many years as a chorister and violinist in the Imperial Court Choir, where he would later teach for much of his life. (The Court Choir was modeled after the more famous one in Vienna, known today as the Vienna Boys Choir). He was unable to gain entrance to either of the major conservatories in Russia, but was nevertheless able to study composition privately with Nikolai Rimsky-Korsakov and Anatoly Liadov.

Kopylov gained a reputation as a symphonist and composer of songs. Through his friendship with Rimsky-Korsakov, he became interested in chamber music, writing four string quartets. Wilhelm Altmann, the chamber music scholar and critic, writes in his Handbuch für Streichquartettspieler:
Kopylov's four carefully written string quartets show an outstanding command of proper quartet style. He gives all of the instruments mutually rich parts to play, alternating in exquisite fashion. His excellence is particularly strong in the sparkling themes. He is able to combine the external beauty of form with effective ideas and distinctive harmonies and rhythms.
A copy of his String Quartet No.2 in F, Op.23 (published by Belyayev in 1894), which is conserved at the Cornell University Library, has notations in the margin of the first violin part from a performance with Eugène Ysaÿe.

Kopylov's Symphony in C minor (Op.14) and Concert Overture (Op.31) have been recorded, as have his contributions to some of the Belyayev circle's projects (such as Les Vendredis).

Notes

References
Some of the information on this page appears on the website of Edition Silvertrust but permission has been granted to copy, distribute and/or modify this document under the terms of the GNU Free Documentation License.
The first two quartets can be downloaded in full score:

External links
 Alexander Kopylov String Quartet No.1, Op.15 Soundbites & Information.
 Alexander Kopylov 14 Tableaux musicals de la vie enfantine, Op.53, for piano Score (from the Sibley Music Library Digital Scores Collection)
 
 

1854 births
1911 deaths
19th-century classical composers
19th-century male musicians
20th-century classical composers
20th-century Russian male musicians
Classical violinists from the Russian Empire
Composers from the Russian Empire
Male classical violinists
Russian Romantic composers
Russian male classical composers